The Nuclear Institute for Food and Agriculture, known as NIFA, is one of four  agriculture and food irradiation research institute managed by the Pakistan Atomic Energy Commission. The institute is tasked to carry out research in Crop production and protection, soil fertility, water management and conservation and value addition of food resources, employing nuclear and other contemporary techniques.

NIFA was the brainchild of Ishrat Hussain Usmani, bureaucrat and chairman of the Pakistan Atomic Energy Commission, however due to economic difficulties, the plans were not carried out until the 1980s. In 1982, Munir Ahmad Khan led the establishment of the institute and its first director was Abdul Rashid who revolutionized the institute.

The NIFA administers cobalt-60 radiation source, Laser absorption spectrometer and Atomic Absorption Spectrophotometry, Near-infrared spectrometer  and Ultraviolet–visible spectroscopy.

A library was opened in 1990, and recently, the institute has acquired 75 acres of land at CHASNUPP-I site.

External links
Official site

Energy in Pakistan
Nuclear technology in Pakistan
Pakistan federal departments and agencies
Science and technology in Pakistan
Project-706
Nuclear weapons programme of Pakistan
Nuclear organizations
Food safety organizations
Constituent institutions of Pakistan Atomic Energy Commission
1982 establishments in Pakistan